Antonio Moreno Ruiz (born 1 February 1983) is a Spanish former professional footballer who played as a forward.

Club career
Born in Málaga, Andalusia, Moreno made his senior debut in the 2000–01 season with hometown club CD El Palo. He signed for CF Extremadura in 2001, only appearing for the reserve team over two years.

Moreno joined Sevilla FC's B side in the Segunda División B in summer 2003. On 21 September 2005, he was an unused substitute for the main squad in a 0–0 home draw against Cádiz CF. He finally featured for the latter on 13 November 2007, playing the last three minutes of a 1–1 draw at CD Dénia in the round of 32 of the Copa del Rey.

In June 2008, Moreno was linked with FK Partizan. A month later, however, he joined Lorca Deportiva CF.

Moreno competed in the third tier the following campaigns, representing UD Marbella, Pontevedra CF, Cádiz CF, CD Puertollano, Barakaldo CF and El Palo.

Personal life
Moreno's younger brother, Jonathan Mejía, was also a footballer and a forward. He represented Honduras internationally.

References

External links

1983 births
Living people
Spanish people of Honduran descent
Spanish footballers
Footballers from Málaga
Association football forwards
Segunda División players
Segunda División B players
Tercera División players
CD El Palo players
Sevilla Atlético players
Sevilla FC players
Lorca Deportiva CF footballers
Marbella FC players
Pontevedra CF footballers
Cádiz CF players
CD Puertollano footballers
Barakaldo CF footballers